is a city located in Ibaraki Prefecture, Japan. , the city had an estimated population of 53,153 in 20,953 households and a population density of 543.4 persons per km2. The percentage of the population aged over 65 was 32.4%.

Geography
Naka is located in north-central Ibaraki Prefecture, with the Naka River and Kuji River flowing through the city.

Surrounding municipalities
Ibaraki Prefecture
 Mito
 Hitachinaka
 Hitachiōta
 Hitachi
Hitachiōmiya
 Tōkai
 Shirosato

Demographics
Per Japanese census data, the population of Naka peaked around the year 2000 and has declined slightly since.

History
On March 31, 1955 the town of Sugaya and villages of Godai, Nakata, Kanzaki, Toda, Yoshino and Kizaki were merged to become the town of Naka (within Naka District). The town was the 4th largest population within the prefecture, following the town of Kamisu (from Kashima District), the town of Sōwa (from Sashima District), and the town of Ami (from Inashiki District). On January 21, 2005 Naka absorbed the town of Urizura (from Naka District) to become the city of Naka. Naka annexed the town of Urizura on January 21, 2005.

Government
Naka has a mayor-council form of government with a directly elected mayor and a unicameral city council of 18 members. Naka contributes one member to the Ibaraki Prefectural Assembly. In terms of national politics, the city is part of Ibaraki 4th district of the lower house of the Diet of Japan.

Economy
Renesas Electronics has a 300mm fab in Naka, Ibaraki prefecture. This semiconductor factory makes chips for the automotive manufacturing industry.

Education
Naka has nine public elementary schools and five public middle schools operated by the city government, and two public high schools operated by the Ibaraki Prefectural Board of Education. The Ibaraki Women's Junior College is also located in Naka.

Transportation

Railway
 JR East – Suigun Line
 -  -  -  -  -  - 
 JR East – Suigun Line - Hitachi-Ōta Branch
  -  -

Highway
  – Naka Interchange

Sister city relations
 Oak Ridge, Tennessee, United States

Local attractions
 The Japan Atomic Energy Agency operates a fusion power research facility in the town, which houses the JT-60, one of the premiere tokamak fusion reactors in the world.
 Ibaraki Botanical Garden
 Kiuchi Brewery
 Kasamatsu Park and Stadium
 Shizu Jinja
 Shizumine Furusato Park

References

External links

Official Website 

Cities in Ibaraki Prefecture
Naka, Ibaraki